Ann-Helena Schlüter (born in Nürnberg) is a Swedish-German pianist, organist, composer and poet.

Life 
Schlüter began her piano lessons at the age of three with her mother, the Swedish piano teacher and organist Ann-Margret Schlüter, née Elmgren, who comes from Småland, Southern Sweden. From the age of seven, she continued her studies with her father, the German pianist Karl-Heinz Schlüter. Schlüter grew up in Würzburg. At the age of five she won her first youth musician piano competition, at eight she played her first piano recital, at ten she performed a Mozart piano concerto for the first time at the Nürnberg Opera House.

In addition to attending the music high schools in Nürnberg and Würzburg, Schlüter became a junior student at the Hochschule für Musik Würzburg with the Swedish pianist Arne Torger. She won the international Steinway Piano Competition Hamburg, the Nürnberg Piano Competition, was several times first prize winner of the national competition Jugend musiziert in piano solo, piano duo and repetition, prize winner of the Robert Schumann Competition Zwickau and 1st prize at the Concerto Competition in London of the Masterworks Festival USA with Schumann's Piano Concerto.

After she gained her Abitur from high school, she studied piano at the Hochschule für Musik und Tanz Köln with Nina Tichman and completed her instrumental pedagogical diploma there. After the soloist class piano at the Hochschule für Musik Detmold with Anatol Ugorski, she successfully completed her artistic diploma and concert exam/master class diploma piano with Bernd Glemser at the Hochschule für Musik Würzburg. This was followed by a master's degree at the Arizona State University in Phoenix with Walter Cosand and Eckart Sellheim as German Academic Exchange Service scholarship holder. During her studies she worked as a lecturer and assistant lecturer for repetition, chamber music and song accompaniment. During a stay abroad in Perth she completed a concert tour through the country.

The artist also writes poetry, prose, novels, articles and songs. Among other things, she won 1st prize at the 11th Villach Literature Competition in Austria. In 2018 she published the novel Frei wie die Vögel, in which she underlays real events – the murder of four clergymen in the "Third Reich", the Lübeck martyrs – with a fictional suggestive framing.

Publications 
 Lebensheiterkeit: Hommage an Joseph Haydn, Audio-CD, 2009.
 Jeden Augenblick, Audio-CD, cap-music, 2010.
 PianoLyrik (with Goldberg-Variationen), Audio-CD, cap-music, 2011.
 Himlasång (Himmelslieder), Doppel-Audio-CD, cap-music, 2012.
 Com’Ann, Audio-CD, cap-music, 2013.
 Pianolyrik opus 1, Flügelworte, 180 Gedichte über Musik. Lorbeer-Verlag, Bielefeld 2013.
 BACH The Art of Fugue, Die Kunst der Fuge. The Leipzig Concert. Double-CD. Periplaneta, 2014.
 Pianolyrik opus 2, Flügelworte, 220 Gedichte. Periplaneta Verlag, Berlin 2015.
 Pianolyrik Bd. 1 und 2, Notes. Waldkauz-Verlag (Hörle Musikhaus), Remscheid 2015.
 Flügel auf Reisen. Die auf den Tasten tanzt. Fontis-Verlag, Basel 2016.
 Bach: Wohltemperiertes Klavier, Steinway D in Leipzig and Schwerin, Doppel-CD. Hänssler Classic, 2017
 Frei wie die Vögel. Eine Erzählung gegen das Vergessen. SCM Verlag, 2018.
 Keine Wolke fällt tiefer als blau, Lyrikband opus 3. Glaré-Verlag, Frankfurt, 2019.
 Das Demutsprinzip in Bachs Musik. Kopaed-Verlag, München 2019.
 Stille och Snö. Neue schwedisch-deutsche Orgelmusik. Heinrichshofen & Noetzel, 2019.
 Bach Fantasias & Duets. Hänssler Classic, 2019

References

External links 
 
 
 Website of Ann-Helena Schlüter
 

German classical pianists
German classical organists
Women classical pianists
German women composers
21st-century German composers
Living people
Musicians from Nuremberg
Year of birth missing (living people)